A statue of Jerry Richardson was installed outside Charlotte, North Carolina's Bank of America Stadium in 2016. Richardson, the former owner of the National Football League's Carolina Panthers, was involved in a controversy involving allegedly sexist behavior prior to selling the team. The statue was removed from Bank of America Stadium in June 2020 for fear it would be destroyed by protestors.

Background
The statue was a gift to Richardson, the founding owner of the Carolina Panthers, during his 80th birthday, given by the team's minority ownership partners. It stood 13 feet tall outside the north entrance of Bank of America Stadium, depicting Richardson in a suit holding a football and flanked by two life-sized black panthers with green eyes.

When the U.S. national anthem protests started back in 2016 in response to police brutality, it was reported by numerous Panthers players such as Tre Boston that Richardson prohibited his players from joining the protests. After Richardson was forced to sell the team after the 2017 season following racist and sexist remarks made to team employees in light of the Me Too movement, David Tepper, the new owner, was forced to keep the statue up as a "contractual obligation" of purchasing the Panthers, much to the chagrin of many fans. However, it was taken down and stored in a hidden place by Panthers management in 2020 in light of the George Floyd protests.

Despite no language indicating the fate of the statue, it has been reported that the Panthers organization does not intend on restoring it. Richardson himself has also reportedly "moved on" and that the statue "is not his focus", according to his spokesperson. Boston later commented that the removal of the statue was "best for the community".

See also
 List of monuments and memorials removed during the George Floyd protests
 Statue of Calvin Griffith
 Statue of Joe Paterno, another sports-related sculpture removed amid controversy regarding the subject

References

Carolina Panthers
Monuments and memorials in North Carolina
Monuments and memorials removed during the George Floyd protests
Outdoor sculptures in North Carolina
Relocated buildings and structures in North Carolina
Sculptures of men in North Carolina
Statues in North Carolina
Statues of sportspeople
2016 sculptures
Statues removed in 2020